Musica Centripeta: The Swiss Radio Tapes 2 is a solo piano album by Stefano Battaglia. It was recorded in 1997 and released by Splasc(h).

Recording and music
The album of solo piano performances by Battaglia was recorded for Swiss radio in 1997. "His compositions – many of them spontaneous – take their time, articulating the inner ear of harmonic construction and proceeding to erect little scalar structures that shift and seem to flit by until a number of them are assembled into one large idea."

Release and reception

Musica Centripeta was released by Splasc(h) in 2000. The AllMusic review concluded that "This second volume must have been a treat to record because, in its elegance and austere grace, it is nothing less than a small masterpiece." AllAboutJazz wrote that "You won't find any hummable tunes on Musica Centripeta, but neither will you find somnolent repetition or forced abstraction. This disc is a serious study of sound, best appreciated with attentive listening and a mind open to creative synthesis."

Track listing
"Il Volo Dell'Ibis"
"Intessitura"
"Pian Del Lago"
"Musica Centripeta"
"Arca"
"Dardo"
"Melancholia Generosissima"
"Diaram"
"Accade"
"Madame Blavatsky"
"Illusionista"
"Limbus"

Personnel
Stefano Battaglia – piano

References

2000 albums
Solo piano jazz albums
Stefano Battaglia albums